AnnaCarinaPop is the third studio album by Peruvian singer Anna Carina released  on June 15, 2010.

Release and reception
The album was released on June 15, 2010, and was certified platinum in Perú for selling more than 10,000 copies.

Promotion
Apart from releasing four singles from  the album, Anna Carina also released the album at 20 percent off in the month of June along with the first 200 copies sold being autographed.

Singles

"Cielo Sin Luz" was released in 2009 as the lead single for the album. The song had airplay success in Perú and other parts of South America. The song reached the top spot on MTV Latin America allowing Anna Carina to enter markets such as Argentina, Ecuador, Colombia, Venezuela, Chile, Puerto Rico, and United States. The song was nominated for Song of the Year and Video of the Year at the Orgullosamente Latino Awards in 2010. The song also won the award for Best Song of the Year at the Comunidad Andina Awards in 2010 given by RadioCan.

"Ya Fue Demasiado" was released as the album's second single in 2010. The song topped the MTV Latin American songs list a few weeks after its release.

"Dime Si Esto Es Amor" was released in 2011 as the third single of the album. The song had success in Perú being considered as the most important song on several radio stations. The music video was released on April 4, 2011 on MTV Latin America. The song was featured on the telenovela Mi corazón insiste en Lola Volcán which aired on Telemundo.

"Me Cansé" was released in 2012 as the fourth and final single from the album. The song had big airplay success in Perú and features a guitar solo from Peruvian Rock singer-songwriter Pedro Suárez-Vértiz who also appears in the video. His appearance on the video got a lot of attention since he had been away from the spotlight for a while after losing his voice due to Progressive bulbar palsy.

Track listing
All credits adapted from Discogs.

Certifications and sales

References

2010 albums
Spanish-language albums
Anna Carina albums